Langbaurgh East was a wapentake of the North Riding of Yorkshire, the eastern division of Langbaurgh, England.  The name is now in use as a local justice area (formerly a petty sessional division), consisting of the eastern, mostly rural part of the borough of Redcar and Cleveland. 

The East Wapentake in particular covered roughly the area of modern-day Redcar & Cleveland and the northernmost parts of the Scarborough district.  The boundary roughly follows from Wilton along to Redcar in the north and all the way down to Whitby in the south across to Danby, west of Whitby then back up along the Cleveland Hills back up to Wilton.

References

Wapentakes of the North Riding of Yorkshire
Redcar and Cleveland
Places in the Tees Valley